This is a list of international football matches of the Germany national football team during its period as West Germany from 1950 until 1990.

Following the end of World War II, Germany was partitioned into rival West and East zones, each with their own football systems. The general turmoil of the period and the country's lack of international footballing pedigree up to that point meant it was a surprise to many when West Germany won the 1954 FIFA World Cup in neighbouring Switzerland. It was in the mid-1960s when German football became very strong, with the backbone of the national squad formed by an exceptional group of young players at FC Bayern Munich, soon augmented further by another very strong team at Borussia Monchengladbach and others from the leading clubs. After reaching the 1966 FIFA World Cup Final, they built on victory in UEFA Euro 1972 by winning the 1974 FIFA World Cup on home soil. A further Euro win in 1980 (after an unexpected loss in the 1976 final), plus further World Cup final appearances in 1982 and 1986 confirmed their status as one of the world's most consistently powerful teams. With the end of the Cold War and reunification of the country approaching at the end of the 1980s, the final achievement of West Germany was winning the 1990 FIFA World Cup.

List of matches 
1950 – 1960 – 1970 – 1980 – 1980

Notes

Cancelled matches 
Below is a list of all matches in the period that were cancelled. Matches that were rescheduled to another date are not included.

See also 
 East Germany national football team results (1952–1990)
 Germany national football team records
 Germany national football team results (1908–1942)
 Germany national football team results (1990–1999)
 Germany national football team results (2000–2019)
 Germany national football team results (2020–present)

References

External links
Results archive at German Football Association (DFB)
(West) Germany - International Results (complete list) at RSSSF
Germany - International Results - Details 1970-1979 at RSSSF 
Germany - International Results - Details 1980-1989 at RSSSF 
Germany - International Results - Details 1990-1999 at RSSSF 
Results archive at National Football Teams
Results archive at World Football

Germany national football team results